The 1898 County Championship was the ninth officially organised running of the County Championship, and ran from 9 May to 3 September 1898. Yorkshire County Cricket Club won their third championship title, with Middlesex finishing as runners-up for the first time.

In April, John Tunnicliffe and Jack Brown of Yorkshire, set a then-record partnership for any wicket of 554, against Derbyshire at Queen's Park, Chesterfield.

Table
 One point was awarded for a win, and one point was taken away for each loss. Final placings were decided by dividing the number of points earned by the number of completed matches (i.e., those that ended in a win or a loss) and multiplying by 100.

Records

References

External links

1898 in English cricket
County Championship seasons
County